The International Sculpture Center is a 501(c)3 nonprofit organization founded in 1960 by Elden Tefft and James A. Sterritt at the University of Kansas. It is currently located on the old New Jersey Fairground in Hamilton, New Jersey

Its goal is to advance the creation and understanding of sculpture and its unique, vital contribution to society.  The center publishes Sculpture, a monthly (except February and August) magazine with offices in Washington, D.C., and presents a Lifetime Achievement in Contemporary Sculpture Award.

Recipients of the lifetime achievement award

 Magdalena Abakanowicz
 Alice Aycock
 Lynda Benglis
 Fletcher Benton
 Fernando Botero
 Louise Bourgeois
 Anthony Caro
 Elizabeth Catlett
 John Chamberlain
 Eduardo Chillida
 Christo and Jeanne-Claude
 Tony Cragg
 Mark di Suvero
 Red Grooms
 Sheila Hicks
 Nancy Holt
 Richard Hunt
 Seward Johnson
 Jun Kaneko
 Phillip King, 2010
 William King
 Manuel Neri
 Claes Oldenburg and Coosje van Bruggen
 Nam June Paik
 Beverly Pepper
 Judy Pfaff
 Arnaldo Pomodoro
 Giò Pomodoro
 Robert Rauschenberg
 George Rickey
 Ursula von Rydingsvard
 Betye Saar
 George Segal
 Joel Shapiro
 Kiki Smith
 Kenneth Snelson
 James Surls
 Frank Stella
 William Tucker, 2010
 Bernar Venet

External links
 ISC website

1960 establishments in New Jersey
Arts foundations based in the United States
Arts organizations based in New Jersey
Arts organizations established in 1960
Hamilton Township, Mercer County, New Jersey
Lifetime achievement awards
Sculpture awards